Jeremiah Williams Cummings (April 1814, in Washington, D.C., U.S.A. – January 4, 1866 at New York) was an American Roman Catholic priest, known as a preacher and writer.

Life
His father's death caused his mother to move to New York in his boyhood, and he was there accepted as an ecclesiastical student by Bishop John Dubois, who sent him to the College of the Propaganda at Rome to make his theological studies. Afterwards he returned to New York, where he was assigned as one of the assistants at St. Patrick's Cathedral. He there proved himself as  linguist, writer, and musician, and a popular preacher and lecturer.

In 1848 Bishop John Hughes selected him to found St. Stephen's parish, New York, and to erect a church. Under the administration of Dr. Cummings St. Stephen's, which he had completed in March, 1854, became a fashionable and frequented church in New York, its sermons and music making it a local attraction. He continued as its pastor till his death.

Controversy
Cummings was the intimate friend and disciple of Orestes A. Brownson, the philosopher and reviewer. He was instrumental in having Brownson change his residence from Boston to New York, took charge of his lecture arrangements, and wrote frequent contributions for the Brownson's Review. "It was often complained of in Brownson", says his son (Middle Life, Detroit, 1899, p. 132), "that he was lacking in policy, and no doubt he was in the habit of plain speaking; but Cummings was more so, and some of the most violent attacks on the editor and his 'Review' were occasioned by unpalatable truths plainly stated by Cummings".

Cummings was one of the leaders in a group of priests and laymen, who were opposed to what they called the "Europeanizing" of the Church in the United States by the foreign-born teachers, to the system of teaching in vogue in the Catholic colleges and seminaries, and who were in favour of conciliating those outside the Church by the use of milder polemics. In an article on "Vocations to the Priesthood" that Cummings contributed to Brownson's Review of October, 1860, he severely criticized the management and mode of instruction in Catholic colleges and seminaries which he styled "cheap priest-factories". This aroused a bitter controversy, and brought out one of the noted essays by Archbishop Hughes, his "Reflections on the Catholic Press".

Works
He was also a contributor to Appleton's Encyclopedia and published in New York:

Italian Legends (1859); 
Songs for Catholic Schools (1862); 
Spiritual Progress (1865); 
The Silver Stole.

His hymn "Hail Virgin of Virgins", published in Songs for Catholic Schools, was later revised into the beloved Marian Hymn "Immaculate Mary".

References

Attribution

External links

1814 births
1866 deaths
Writers from Washington, D.C.
Writers from New York City
19th-century American Roman Catholic priests